Something is a 2018 microbudget mystery horror film written and directed by Stephen Portland in his feature directorial debut.

Plot 
Two new parents struggle to look after their new baby, while becoming concerned that an intruder might be entering their home.

Cast
 Michael Gazin as Man
 Jane Rowen as Woman
 Joel Clark Ackerman as Cop
 Eric Roberts as Coroner

Critical reception
On Rotten Tomatoes, the film has an approval rating of 50% based on 6 reviews, indicating a mixed reception. Owen Gleiberman of Variety writing "“Something” has a few observations to make about the perils of contemporary parenthood, but instead of whipping them into tension it douses them in catch-as-catch-can thriller vagueness." Kimber Myers of Los Angeles Times wrote that the film did not live up to the potential of its premise, and had "few scares and a mystery without answers." Lorry Kikta of Film Threat writing "Something is a masterfully intelligent, delightfully spooky meditation on the dark side of being a first-time parent."

References

External links
 

2018 horror films
2018 independent films